The system of geometric shorthand published in Britain by Samuel Taylor in 1786, under the title An essay intended to establish a standard for an universal system of Stenography, or Short-hand writing, was the first shorthand system to be used across the English-speaking world. Taylor shorthand uses an alphabet of 19 letters of simplified shape. His book was translated and published in France by Théodore-Pierre Bertin in 1792 under the title Système universel et complet de Stenographie ou Manière abrégée d'écrire applicable à tous les idiomes.

Principles
Vowels are omitted except at the beginning and end of a word, where all vowels and diphthongs are written as a single dot. A single letter stands for both f and v, one for s and z, and another for g (either pronunciation) and j, as well as additional letters for ch, sh, th. The consonants are joined, as in cursive Latin script, apart from a couple of suffixes; when two of the same consonant come together (due to the omission of an intervening vowel), they are written with a single letter of larger size. (An exception: when two "r"s are written, without an adjoining consonant, as in 'rare', then the second is written as an italic Latin r.)

Taylor shorthand is written partially phonetically, so that, for example, an English word containing ph is written with the letter for f, and c is written as k or s. H tends to be omitted medially and even initially, a vowel dot written instead, presumably reflecting Taylor's pronunciation.

In addition to sounds, each letter stands for several common short words. There is a special letter for suffixes pronounced like -ious and the abbreviation viz. (used for namely or as follows).

The shapes of the letters are as follows. Because they are not supported by computer fonts, Canadian syllabics have been substituted where these have approximately the same shape (though they tend to have deeper curves and shorter lines than the shorthand letters); where a symbol is not available, a description is given. L and r are written upwards; all other vertical and diagonal letters are written downwards.

*When the only consonant in a word is r, it is written as an italic Latin r, and so the second r in a sequence rr, but when joined to a consonant (even at the end of a word) it is written like d, distinguished by the direction of the stroke. (The direction becomes obvious when letters are joined.)

Various suffixes are plural -s (a dash over the last letter), -ly (a dot below the last letter, so  'holy'), -ing (a ᐟ after the word, or below the last letter for -ings, so - turned 90° 'kings'), -tion (a dot above the last letter, so  turned 90° 'notion'), -tions (a ᐟ above the last letter), -ble (as b), -ment (as m), -ject (as j), -ward (as w), -ship (as sh).

Notes

External links
 

Shorthand systems